William Frederick Burtenshaw (13 December 1925 – 23 February 2010) was an English professional footballer.

Born in Portslade, he played amateur football in Sussex, including for Southwick, and then went on to play professionally for Luton Town and Gillingham between 1948 and 1952, and in total made 40 appearances in the Football League, scoring eight goals. He played alongside his brother, Charlie Burtenshaw, at both Luton and Gillingham, and they played together for Kentish non-league clubs Snowdown Colliery and Canterbury City.

Burtenshaw died on 23 February 2010.

References

1925 births
English footballers
2010 deaths
Association football inside forwards
Southwick F.C. players
Luton Town F.C. players
Gillingham F.C. players
Snowdown Colliery Welfare F.C. players
Canterbury City F.C. players
English Football League players